Courtin is a surname. Notable people with the surname include:
Charles Courtin (1902–?), French long jumper
Christina Courtin (born 1984), American singer, violinist, and songwriter
Cyrille Courtin (born 1971), former professional footballer
Robina Courtin (born 1944), Buddhist nun in the Tibetan Buddhist Gelugpa tradition

See also
as an abbreviation of "courting":
Drinkin' and Courtin'
Frog Went A-Courtin' (book)